Old Man with a Gold Chain is a portrait by Rembrandt, painted around 1631 and now in the Art Institute of Chicago.

This painting was documented by Hofstede de Groot as a portrait of Rembrandt's father in 1915, who wrote:675. HARMEN GERRITSZ VAN RIJN. Half-length, without hands; almost life size. He is inclined to the left, but his head and eyes are turned to the right. He wears a dark purple cloak, over which hangs a gold chain with a medallion. Round his neck is a small close-fitting steel gorget. In his right ear is a pearl. He has a short greyish beard, and curly hair covered by a broad-brimmed black hat with two dark ostrich feathers. Painted about 1631. Signed on the left at foot with the monogram "R H L"; canvas, 32 inches by 30 inches. There are copies:

 Bode 217; Wb. 156; B.-HdG. 29. Mentioned by Moes, No. 6687, ii; Bode, p. 413; Dutuit, p. 43; Michel, pp. 44, 557, 561 [35, 432, 443]. Sale. Beresford Hope, London, May 1886. In the possession of C. Sedelmeyer, Paris, "Catalogue of 300 Paintings," 1898, No. 111. In the collection of W. H. Beers, New York. In the collection of S. Neumann, London. 
 Sale. Martineau and others, London, March 10, 1902. 
 Panel, 23 1/2 inches by 19 inches. Sale. Causid-Brück of Cassel, Frankfort-on-Main, February 10, 1914, No. 25.

Exhibited at Düsseldorf, 1912, No. 43. Sale. M. P. W. Boulton, London, December 9, 1911, No. 14. In the possession of P. and D. Colnaghi and Obach, London. In the possession of Julius Böhler, Munich. Sale. Marczell von Nemes of Budapest, Paris, June 17, 1913, No. 60 (516,000 francs, S. de Ricci). In the possession of Julius Böhler, Munich. In the possession of Reinhardt, New York. In a private collection, Chicago.

References

Halffiguur van een man met halsberg en gevederde baret, ca. 1631 in the RKD

External links
 Artic.edu: Old Man with a Gold Chain
 Artic.edu: Renaissance exhibitions

Paintings by Rembrandt
Portraits of men
1631 paintings
17th-century portraits
Portraits by Dutch artists
Paintings in the collection of the Art Institute of Chicago